The Iași train accident occurred on September 8, 2013 at 15:00 local time (UTC+3) when 11 people died, including a 14-year-old boy after a collision between a minibus and a train in Iași County, Romania.

The train involved in the accident was operated by private rail company Regiotrans and ran between Iași and Dorohoi. All of the dead were on the minibus, which ignored posted signs at the railway crossing, none of the passengers and crew aboard the train were injured or killed. There were no survivors in the minibus.

See also
 Scânteia train accident
 List of road accidents 2010–2019

References

External links
 Photos and videos on the accident (CONTAINS BLOODY IMAGES).
 Voice of Russia

2013 in Romania
Bus incidents in Romania
2013 road incidents
Iași County
Level crossing incidents in Romania
Railway accidents in 2013
September 2013 events in Europe
2013 disasters in Romania